Chet Moeller (born December 30, 1953) is a retired American football player who played for the Navy Midshipmen as a defensive back.  In 2010, he was inducted into the College Football Hall of Fame. Moeller's jersey was retired by the Navy football in 2021.

References

External links
 

1953 births
Living people
American football defensive backs
Navy Midshipmen football players
All-American college football players
College Football Hall of Fame inductees
People from Kettering, Ohio
People from Montgomery County, Tennessee
Players of American football from Ohio